Asak (also romanized as Āsak; also known as Ās-e Bād) is a village in Margan Rural District, in the Central District of Hirmand County, Sistan and Baluchestan Province, Iran. At the 2006 census, its population was 108, in 22 families.

References 

Populated places in Hirmand County